Phasaelis (1st-century) was a princess of Nabatea, daughter of king Aretas IV Philopatris. 

She was married to prince Herod Antipas. 

Phasaelis fled to her father when she discovered her husband intended to divorce her in order to marry Herodias. This caused a war between her former spouse and her father.

References

Herodian dynasty
1st-century women
1st-century deaths
1st-century Arabs
Jewish royalty
Ancient princesses
Nabataea